Limnonectes micrixalus is a species of frog in the family Dicroglossidae.
It is endemic to the Philippines.

Its natural habitats are subtropical or tropical moist lowland forest and rivers. Its status is insufficiently known.

References

Sources

micrixalus
Amphibians of the Philippines
Taxonomy articles created by Polbot
Amphibians described in 1923